The Socket 8 CPU socket was used exclusively with the Intel Pentium Pro and Pentium II Overdrive computer processors. Intel discontinued Socket 8 in favor of Slot 1 with the introduction of the Pentium II and Slot 2 with the release of the Pentium II Xeon in 1999.

Technical specifications
Socket 8 is a unique rectangular CPGA socket with 387 pins. It supports FSB speeds ranging from 60 to 66 MHz, a voltage from 3.1 or 3.3V, and support for the Pentium Pro and the Pentium II OverDrive CPUs. Socket 8 also has a unique pin arrangement pattern. One part of the socket has pins in a PGA grid, while the other part uses a SPGA grid.

Intel did not return to rectangular sockets until the launch of LGA 1700 in late 2021.

See also
List of Intel microprocessors

References

Socket 008